"Ballin" is a song by American record producer Mustard, featuring rapper Roddy Ricch. The track was released as the third single from Mustard's third studio album, Perfect Ten, on August 20, 2019, though it was available as early as the end of June 2019. The song and its accompanying video received acclaim from music critics, with Complex magazine naming it the Best Song of 2019. It peaked at number 11 on the Billboard Hot 100, marking Mustard's highest charting song in the US. The song received a nomination for Best Rap/Sung Performance at the 2020 Grammy Awards, making it the first time Ricch has been nominated for a Grammy and Mustard's first nomination as an artist. 

Later in 2019, Mustard and Ricch released another collaboration, "High Fashion".

Background 
Roddy Ricch revealed in an interview that the song was composed in late 2018, but Mustard wanted to keep it for his album, Perfect Ten, which he was still working on. The song was later included on the album, released in June 2019. Ricch said he knew the song was "hard enough" the first time he heard it, while Mustard proclaimed "this is going to be the one".

Composition and lyrics 
"Ballin is a hip-hop track that has somewhat of a "rags to riches" theme. In its intro, the song samples girl group 702's 1997 top ten hit "Get It Together".

The song features a "smooth, bouncy beat", with Roddy Ricch rapping about his come-up and ascent in the music industry.

In the first verse, Ricch salutes fellow Los Angeles rapper, the late Nipsey Hussle and his girlfriend Lauren London: "I run these racks up with my queen like London and Nip". The line simultaneously references Ricch and Hussle's collaboration "Racks in the Middle", released earlier in 2019 as Hussle's last single before his death. Billboards Heran Mamo noted that "in typical Hussle fashion", Roddy Ricch "narrates his life's hardships before delving into his newfound treasures".

Critical reception 
The song was widely acclaimed by music critics. Charles Holmes of Rolling Stone magazine called it "a song of the year contender", while Complex and Billboard both named it as a "standout track" on the album. Pitchfork magazine included "Ballin in its list of The Best Rap Songs of 2019 and called it "the centerpiece of Mustard's underappreciated album Perfect Ten". Complex later named it the Best Song of 2019, calling it "a feel-good anthem so infectious you'll need antibiotics just to stop running it back".

Chart performance 
"Ballin has become Mustard's highest charting song in the US, peaking at number 11 on the Billboard Hot 100. It was also Roddy Ricch's highest charting song, until he surpassed it a week later, with the release of his album track "The Box", which eventually reached number 1 on the chart. It reached number one on Billboards Rhythmic Songs chart, becoming Mustard's second number one following "Pure Water" and Ricch's first number one. The song also topped the Rap Airplay chart.

Music video 
The music video for the track was teased by Mustard on his Instagram page on September 29, 2019. The music video for the track was eventually released on October 2, 2019 to critical acclaim.

Live performances 

On December 16, 2019, Roddy Ricch performed the song live, alongside an 8-piece orchestra, at Peppermint Club in Los Angeles for Audiomack's Trap Symphony series.

Other uses 
The song can be heard on "Elyse's Skit", track 10 off Roddy Ricch's debut album Please Excuse Me for Being Antisocial. In the skit, which is an actual voicenote recording, the mother of a woman named Elyse sends her (Elyse) a voicenote, with "Ballin playing in the background, while the mother proceeds to say "I can't get that damn song out my head", jokingly calling it "inappropriate music". Ricch called the skit "something natural".

Awards and nominations 
62nd Annual Grammy Awards

Charts

Weekly charts

Year-end charts

Certifications

References 

2019 songs
2019 singles
Mustard (record producer) songs
Roddy Ricch songs
Songs written by Mustard (record producer)
Interscope Records singles
Songs written by Roddy Ricch
Songs written by Donell Jones